Antonio Lasciac (Italian) or Anton Laščak (Slovene) (21 September 1856 – 26 December 1946) was an architect, engineer, poet and musician of Slovene descent, who designed the Khedive's Palace in Istanbul and the Tahra Palace in Cairo.

Life 

Lasciac was born to Peter Laščak and Jožefa (née Trampuš) in the Italian Gorizia suburb of San Rocco in 1856 in then Austria-Hungary, today Italy. He was the first of ten children. Three of his siblings died in childhood. He immigrated to Gorizia and opened a business with Mihael Trampuš, another Slovene. He fell in love with Trampuš's daughter and took over his crafts workshop after the marriage. Her official Italian name is written as Gioseffa. Her father Mihael was born in Gorizia, to farmers from the surrounding Karst Plateau.

After finishing primary and secondary school in Gorizia, Lasciac studied at the Vienna Polytechnic Institute.
While still a student, Lasciac married Maria Plesnizer (also Marija Alojzija Plesničar) from a Slovene family. Maria bore three children with unusual and fully Italian names: Plautilla Angelina Francesca, Fabrizio Antonio Giuseppe and Romeo Italico Alessandro (died 1926).

He first traveled to Egypt to assist in rebuilding Alexandria after the destruction by the British Bombardment of Alexandria in July 1882.
Under the Khedive Abbas II of Egypt, he got a job and title as an Egyptian court architect in 1907. Later he lost this job. During World War I, as national of Austria-Hungary and thus of the enemy he had to leave Egypt. After the war, he returned to Egypt and used to spend the summers in Gorizia and the winters in Egypt. After moving to Cairo on 5 October 1946 he died there on 26 December 1946. He was buried at the Latin Cemetery in Cairo.

Lasciac designed buildings in Gorizia and many Eastern capitals and cities, especially Egypt. The Khedive's Palace in Istanbul and the Tahra Palace in Cairo (1907) are among his most notable works.
Of his drawings about a hundred have survived. As of 2015, they were in the private archive of Mercedes Volait in Paris.

Works (incomplete) 

 apartment buildings for the Societé des Immeubles d'Egypte, 1883-1886, rue Cherif, Alexandria
 Menasce Okelle (or Galleria Menasce), 1883–1887, Alexandria
 Ramleh Railway Station, 1887, Alexandria (today replaced)
 Headquarters of the Jewish Community of Alexandria, 1887, Alexandria
 Palace of Prince Said Halim Pasha, 1896–1899, Maarouf, Downtown, Cairo (later Nasriya school)
 Suarès Palace (later Risotto Club), 1897, Cairo
 Villa Mazloum Pasha, 1898–1899, Alexandria
 Palace of Prince Kamal Al-Din Hussein And Princess Niemat-Allah, 1906, Cairo
 Aisha Fahmy Palace, 1907, Zamalek, Cairo
 Tahra Palace, 1907, Cairo
 Khedive's Palace, 1907, Istanbul
 Villa Lasciac, 1909, Gorizia
 Abdeen Palace, extension, Cairo
 Assicurazioni Generali di Trieste SpA building, 1911, Cairo
 St. Peter and St. Paul's Church, 1911, Cairo
 Villa of Princess Fatma Al-Zahra, 1919, Alexandria (today Royal Jewelry Museum)
 Headquarters of Banque Misr, 1927, Cairo

Honors 
Asteroid 292459 Antoniolasciac, discovered by astronomers at the Italian Farra d'Isonzo Observatory in 2006, was named in his memory. The official  was published by the Minor Planet Center on 14 November 2016.

References

Sources cited 
 
 
 
 Khalil, Mohamed Ali Mohamed. The Italian Architecture in Alexandria Egypt (Thesis submitted to University Kore of Enna to obtain Second level master's degree in architecture restoration A.A. 2008–2009)

Further reading

External links 

1856 births
1946 deaths
Italian engineers
Architects from Friuli-Venezia Giulia
Italian people of Slovene descent